Arturo Mercado Chacón (born December 7, 1940) is a Mexican voice actor who has dubbed many movie and television characters to Spanish for the Latin American movie and television market since 1963. He is the husband of Magdalena Leonel de Cervantes and the father of Arturo Mercado Jr., Carmen Mercado and Angeles Mercado.

Work

Films

Animated movies

Television
 Walter in Automan
 Walter "Radar" O'Reilly in M*A*S*H*
 Walter O'Reilly from W*A*L*T*E*R
 Mickey Horton in Días de Nuestras Vidas
 Peter Parker from Spiderman (70's TV series)
 Phineas Bogg from Voyagers!

Animated characters
 Bob from Bob the Builder
 Toad from Gummy Bears
 James the Red Engine from Thomas the Tank Engine and Friends
 Drake Mallard/Darkwing from El Pato Darkwing
 Scrooge McDuck (Rico McPato) in Pato Aventuras
 Shaggy in Scooby-Doo
 Doburoku in Eyeshield 21
 Zabon from Dragon Ball Z
 Simba in Timon y Pumbaa
 Simba, McDuck, Beast and Winnie the Pooh in El Show del Ratón
 Wally Gator/Pixe & Dixie/Mildew Wolf/Shaggy from Laff-A-Lympics
 Wooldoor Sockbat from La Casa de los Dibujos
 Lawrence Fletcher from Phineas and Ferb 
 Sergei/"D" from Key the Metal Idol
 Shaggy in Harvey Birdman, Abogado
 Clumsy, Brainy, Jokey, Grandpa Smurf from The Smurfs
 Robin from Super Friends
 Yoda in Star Wars: Clone Wars and Star Wars: The Clone Wars
 Guy-Am-I in Green Eggs and Ham
 Luna in Kitty Is Not a Cat

See also
 List of Mexican voice actors

External links
  (Interview in Spanish)
 
 
 

1940 births
Living people
Mexican male voice actors
20th-century Mexican male actors
21st-century Mexican male actors
Mexican male actors